Patrick H. Conway (born 1974) is an American physician and an advocate of health system transformation and innovation in the public and private sector. He is a practicing pediatrician formerly serving at the Cincinnati Children's Hospital and Children's National Medical Center. He was the chief medical officer and acting administrator at the Centers for Medicare and Medicaid Services (CMS) leading quality-of-care efforts for the nation. He also served as the Director of the Center for Medicare and Medicaid Innovation, responsible for new national payment models for Medicare and Medicaid focused on better quality and lower costs.

Biography 
Conway was born in College Station, Texas in 1974 and was the youngest of the four children. His father was a chemistry professor and his mother was an assistant dean at a business school. He got his bachelor's degree from Texas A&M University, and attended Baylor College of Medicine, followed by his residency at Boston Children's Hospital.

In 2007, Conway came to Washington as a White House fellow and worked for the then Secretary of Health and Human Services, Mike Leavitt. He served as the Deputy Administrator for Innovation and Quality for the Centers for Medicare and Medicaid Services from May 2011 to September 2017 and joined the Blue Cross Blue Shield of North Carolina in October 2017. Conway was CEO of Blue Cross NC from 2017 to 2019 and has been CEO of Care Solutions at Optum since 2020.

Arrest and conviction 
On June 22, 2019, Conway was driving erratically on I-85 with his two daughters, ages 7 and 9, in a Cadillac Escalade. A motorist filmed Conway swerving in and out of traffic, ultimately crashing into a tractor trailer. Conway, who a police report noted had bloodshot eyes, smelled of alcohol and had trouble maintaining his balance when he got out of the SUV, refused a Breathalyzer test and was jailed. At the police station, WRAL reported Conway became "absolutely belligerent," refusing a breath-alcohol test and cursing at officers. When he was put in a holding cell, he began kicking and pounding on the door, and needed help holding the pen to sign his bond documents. "Conway had to be shackled to deter him from kicking the holding cell door," the report states. Conway threatened, saying "'You had a choice. You could have let me go. You don't know who I am. I am a doctor, a CEO of a company. I'll call Governor Cooper and get you in trouble." Reports also indicated that Conway also asked multiple times for officers to "just unarrest him and let him go," the report states. He was convicted in North Carolina on October 8, 2019, of driving while impaired and two counts of misdemeanor child abuse.

Advocacy 
Conway is an advocate of value-based healthcare services. He introduced new payment models for hospitals and doctors under Medicare and led the efforts to measure the quality of care provided by the healthcare professionals. According to him, healthcare providers should be paid for the outcome of care provided rather than the fee-for-service model. He also helped create Accountable Care Organizations (ACOs) and the Medicare shared savings program. He led the CMS Innovation Center to transform the Medicare program, moving from zero payments in alternative payment models based on value to over 30% of Medicare payments.

Associations and recognition 
Conway is a board member of private organizations, Aledade, Intarcia Therapeutics, and Sound Physicians, and is a member of the National Academy of Medicine since 2014. He has received the President's Distinguished Senior Executive Rank and HHS Secretary's Distinguished Service awards. He has published over 100 peer reviewed articles on health care policy, value-based payment, innovation, delivery system transformation, and other healthcare topics.

References 

1974 births
Living people
21st-century American physicians
Physicians from Texas
Physicians from Ohio
Physicians from Washington, D.C.
American pediatricians
Texas A&M University alumni
People from College Station, Texas
Baylor College of Medicine alumni
Members of the National Academy of Medicine